José Ramírez may refer to:

Sportspeople
José Luis Ramírez (born 1958), retired Mexican boxer
José Luis Ramírez (racing driver) (born 1979), NASCAR driver
José Ramírez (footballer, born 1977), Argentine football goalkeeper
José Ramírez (footballer, born 1982), Mexican footballer
José Ramírez (footballer, born 1990), Colombian football defender
José Ramírez (footballer, born 1996), Mexican footballer
José Ramírez (pitcher) (born 1990), Dominican baseball pitcher
José Ramírez (boxer) (born 1992), American boxer
José Ramírez (infielder) (born 1992), Dominican baseball infielder

Music
José Ramírez (luthier) (1858–1923), luthier
José Ramírez III (1922–1995), luthier and grandson of José Ramírez (luthier)
José Agustín Ramírez Altamirano (1903–1957), Mexican composer

Others
José Fernando Ramírez (1804–1871), Mexican historian
José Santos Ramírez (1790–1851), Argentine soldier
José Ramírez Gamero, Mexican politician, Governor of Durango